Shape coding is a method of design of a control that allows the control's function to be signified by the shape of the control.  It was used successfully by Alphonse Chapanis on airplane controls to improve aviation safety.

External links
A paper on the design of controls (pdf file)

Design